Past to Present 1977–1990 is the first compilation album by Toto, released in 1990. It contains nine hit songs from the band's first seven albums, and four new songs recorded with new singer Jean-Michel Byron.

According to the band, it was Toto's record label Columbia who proposed the band work with Byron. Ultimately the band was not happy with his onstage antics and was asked to leave the band. Steve Lukather became Toto's lead vocalist in 1991.

Track listing

Some CD inlays and LP sleeves may have the song '99' wrongly dated as a 1988 track. It dates from 1979. Also on this album, the only Toto member that wasn't named in the credits was Fergie Frederiksen, Lead vocalist on the album; Isolation (1984).

Charts

Weekly charts

Year-end charts

Certifications

References

Toto (band) albums
1990 compilation albums